Allan Lawrence may refer to:

Allan Lawrence (politician) (1925–2008), Canadian politician
Allan Lawrence (athlete) (1930–2017), Australian athlete
Allan Lawrence (Photographer) (born 2002),Indian Photographer

See also
Alan Lawrence (born 1962), Scottish footballer
Al Lawrence (disambiguation)